was a Japanese boy band created by Johnny Kitagawa before the formation of the Japanese talent agency Johnny & Associates.

The group was formed in April 1962 and lasted until November 20, 1967. They are considered one of the first of Japan's idol groups. Johnnys is also an abbreviation for "Johnny's Jimusho" and also for the talents signed to the agency. For the sake of convenience in Japan, the group is often called "First Generation Johnny's" or "Founding Johnnys". For those considered to be "bishōnen" the term "Johnnys Type" is used. The word, despite referring to one male's looks, is not to be mistaken for the word "Ikemen".

Their debut single "Wakai Namida" (1964) was composed by Hachidai Nakamura with the lyrics by Rokusuke Ei. Nakamura and Ei formerly made the music and lyric of Kyu Sakamoto's U.S. Billboard Hot 100 number-one single "Sukiyaki." On December 31, 1965, Johnnys sang the song "Mack the Knife" in the 16th NHK Kōhaku Uta Gassen at the Tokyo Takarazuka Theater.

Members
 (November 1, 1946 — March 6, 2000)
 (born August 23, 1946)
 (born September 18, 1947)
 (born January 10, 1948)

Discography

Singles
 Wakai Namida (Young Tears)
 Wakai Yoru (Young Night)
 Honō no Kaabu (Curved Flame)
 Girl Happy
 Eikō no March (Glorious March)
 Kimi ga Wakamono Nara (You are a Young Man)
 Naiteita Jenny (Crying Jenny)
 Batman * used as the theme song for the Japanese airing of the television series Batman
 Ōi Waai Chichichi
 Kiri no Yoru no Aishuu (The Sorrow of the Night's Fog)
 Tokei wo Tomete (Clock's Stopped)
 Taiyō no Aitsu (Guy of the Sun)
 Itsuka Dokoka de (Someday, anywhere)
 Wakai Nihon no Uta (Song of Japan's Youth)

Albums
 Jyaniizu to Amerika Ryokou ~ Jyaniizu Shou Jikkyou Rokuon (Johnnys and an American Journey ~ Johnnys Real Recording~)

References

Japanese boy bands

Japanese pop music groups
Johnny & Associates
Musical groups from Tokyo
Musical groups established in 1962
Musical groups disestablished in 1967
1962 establishments in Japan
1967 disestablishments in Japan